Appius Claudius Pulcher (c. 129 BC – 76 BC) was a Roman noble, general and politician of the 1st century BC. He was the father of a number of renowned Romans, most notable: the infamous Clodius and Clodia.

Biography
There is uncertainty about who his father was. It was most probably the Appius Claudius Pulcher who was consul in 143 BC. He was a supporter of Lucius Cornelius Sulla and served as praetor in 88 BC. He was exiled in that year by Gaius Marius while Sulla was away in the east. He returned to Rome after Lucius Cornelius Cinna died in 84 BC, and served as consul in 79 BC and as governor of Roman Macedonia from 78 BC to 76 BC.

Family
Appius Claudius Pulcher was likely married to a Caecilia Metella (a daughter of Balearicus), although this is not universally agreed upon, T. P. Wiseman believes that his wife was a Servilia Caepione (it is known that there was a Servilia around this time that was the wife of a Pulcher, but it is not known who either of them were). Jeffrey Tatum thinks that there is too little information to be sure either way.

He had six known children:
 Appius Claudius Pulcher (consul of 54 BC)
 Gaius Claudius Pulcher
 Publius Claudius Pulcher, who changed his name to Clodius
 Claudia Tertia, who married Quintus Marcius Rex
 Claudia (also known as Clodia), the wife of Quintus Caecilius Metellus Celer
 Claudia (c. 90 BC – aft. 66 BC), first wife of Lucius Licinius Lucullus, whom she divorced in 66 BC

T. P. Wiseman also speculated that Clodia the wife of Aulus Ofilius may have been one of his daughters.

See also
 List of Roman consuls

References

Sources
 Christian Settipani. Continuité gentilice et continuité sénatoriale dans les familles sénatoriales romaines à l'époque impériale, 2000, p 62.

120s BC births
Year of birth uncertain
76 BC deaths
Roman Republican praetors
Senators of the Roman Republic
Appius (consul 675 AUC)
2nd-century BC Romans
1st-century BC Roman consuls
Roman governors of Macedonia
Optimates